The Best of the Bonzo Dog Band is a CD collecting the best cuts from albums of The Bonzo Dog Band.  It was released in 1990 on Rhino Records.

Track listing 
 "The Intro and the Outro" 3:05
 "Bonzo Dog Band / Ali-Baba's Camel" 3:34
 "Hello Mabel" 2:49
 "Kama Sutra" 0:41
 "Hunting Tigers Out In 'Indiah'" 3:07
 "Shirt" 4:28
 "I'm Bored" 3:07
 "Rockaliser Baby" 3:29
 "Rhinocratic Oaths" 3:23
 "Tent" 3:12
 "Beautiful Zelda" 2:27
 "Can Blue Men Sing the Whites?" 2:50
 "The Bride Stripped Bare By 'Bachelors'" 2:41
 "Look At Me, I'm Wonderful" 1:50
 "Canyons of Your Mind" 3:06
 "Mr. Apollo" 4:21
 "Trouser Press" 2:21
 "Bonzo Dog Band / Ready-Mades" 3:11
 "We Are Normal" 4:52
 "I'm the Urban Spaceman" 2:25
 "Trouser Freak" 2:53
 "The Sound of Music" 1:23
 "Suspicion" 3:30
 "Big Shot" 3:28

References

Bonzo Dog Doo-Dah Band compilation albums
Rhino Records compilation albums
1990 greatest hits albums